The 2014 Atlantic Coast Conference men's basketball tournament was the postseason men's basketball tournament for the Atlantic Coast Conference held from March 12–16 in Greensboro, North Carolina, at the Greensboro Coliseum. This was the first ACC Tournament to include 15 teams, a result of the conference adding Syracuse, Pitt, and Notre Dame, and also the last to feature Maryland, which left after the season for the Big Ten Conference. Seeds #5 through #9 received a first-round bye, and the top four seeds received a first- and second-round "double bye".

Top-seeded Virginia won the tournament under the guidance of Tony Bennett, defeating Florida State, Pittsburgh, and then Duke in the championship game.  It was their second ACC tournament championship and first since 1976. Virginia had lost its most recent five appearances in the tournament championship game, losing to North Carolina in 1977, 1982, and 1994, to NC State in 1983, and to Georgia Tech in 1990. The Cavaliers placed four players on the all-tournament teams, and their leading scorer, Joe Harris, was named tournament MVP.

Seeds

Schedule

Bracket

* Denotes Overtime Game

AP Rankings at time of tournament

Awards and honors
Tournament MVP: Joe Harris, Virginia

All-Tournament Teams:

First Team
 Joe Harris, Virginia
 Malcolm Brogdon, Virginia
 Jabari Parker, Duke
 T. J. Warren, NC State
 Talib Zanna, Pitt

Second Team
 Anthony Gill, Virginia
 Akil Mitchell, Virginia
 Rodney Hood, Duke
 Amile Jefferson, Duke
 Lamar Patterson, Pitt

See also
 2014 ACC women's basketball tournament

References

Tournament
ACC men's basketball tournament
College sports in North Carolina
Basketball competitions in Greensboro, North Carolina
ACC men's basketball tournament
ACC men's basketball tournament